Muhammad Hanif Jalandhari (born; 8 November 1963) (مولانا محمد حنیف جالندھری) is a Pakistani Islamic scholar, incumbent General Secretary of Wifaq ul Madaris Al-Arabia, Pakistan the rector of Jamia Khairul Madaris since 1981
 and Chairman of Punjab Quran Board. He has also served as Vice-president of Wifaq ul Madaris Al-Arabia, Pakistan from 8 June 1989 to 2 March 1998.

He was awarded from the International Organization for Quran Memorization (a subsidiary of Muslim World League) for producing the most Huffaz of Quran in the world in the year 2013 - 2014.

References

Pakistani Islamic religious leaders
Pakistani Sunni Muslim scholars of Islam
Living people
Deobandis
Vice presidents of Wifaq ul Madaris Al-Arabia
Muslim missionaries
Hanafis
1963 births
General Secretaries of Wifaq ul Madaris Al-Arabia
Jamia Khairul Madaris people